James Woolley Summers (24 March 1849 – 1 January 1913) was a British Liberal Party politician.

Background
He was born in Dukinfield, Lancashire on 24 March 1849, the son of John Summers of Sunnyside, Ashton-under-Lyne. He married in 1883, Edith Mason, daughter of Hugh Mason, Member of Parliament for Ashton-under-Lyne. They had one son and one daughter, Lilias.

He died in London on 1 January 1913.

Career
He was an Iron Master and Chairman of John Summers and Co., Ltd. He was a member of the Stalybridge Town Council and School Board. He was a member of the Flintshire County Council and was its Chairman from 1904 to 1910. He was Member of Parliament for the Liberal seat of Flint Boroughs from 1910 until his death. He was first elected at the General Election of January 1910, holding the seat for the Liberals. He held the seat at the following General Election;

He was in favour of the Disestablishment of the Church in Wales. He was in favour of Self-Government for Ireland in purely Irish affairs subject to the supreme authority of the Imperial Parliament. He served as a Justice of the Peace in Lancashire, Denbighshire and Flintshire.

Sources
British parliamentary election results 1885–1918, Craig, F. W. S.

References

1849 births
1913 deaths
Liberal Party (UK) MPs for Welsh constituencies
UK MPs 1910–1918
People from Dukinfield
Liberal Party (UK) councillors
Members of Flintshire County Council
UK MPs 1910